A dicastery (from , from δικαστής, 'judge, juror') is the name of some departments of the Roman Curia.

Pastor bonus 
Pastor bonus (1988) includes this definition:

Praedicate evangelium 
Under the new structure of the Roman Curia created by Praedicate evangelium (effective since 5 June 2022), the former titles of Congregations and Pontifical Councils are replaced with the term Dicastery.

References